Below is a list of literary magazines and journals: periodicals devoted to book reviews, creative nonfiction, essays, poems, short fiction, and similar literary endeavors.

Because the majority are from the United States, the country of origin is only listed for those outside the U.S.

Only those magazines that are exclusively published online are identified as such.

Currently published
List of no longer published journals is below, with beginning and ending dates.

0–9

A

B

C

D

E

F

G

H

I

J

K

L

M

N

O

P

Q

R

S

T

U

V

W

X

Y

Z

Magazines which are no longer published

See also
 Council of Literary Magazines and Presses
 List of art magazines
 List of political magazines
 Science fiction magazine
 Fantasy fiction magazine
 Horror fiction magazine

References

External links
 NewPages – List of online and print literary magazines
 CLMP - Directory of all publishing literary magazines

Lists of magazines
Magazines